The University of Zürich (UZH) is a public research university located in the city of Zürich, Switzerland. It is the largest university in Switzerland, with its 28,000 enrolled students. It was founded in 1833 from the existing colleges of theology, law, medicine which go back to 1525, and a new faculty of philosophy.
 
Currently, the university has seven faculties: Philosophy, Human Medicine, Economic Sciences, Law, Mathematics and Natural Sciences, Theology and Veterinary Medicine. The university offers the widest range of subjects and courses of any Swiss higher education institution.

History

The University of Zurich was founded on April 29, 1833, when the existing colleges of theology, the Carolinum founded by Huldrych Zwingli in 1525, law and medicine were merged with a new faculty of Philosophy. It was the first university in Europe to be founded by the state rather than a monarch or church.

In the university's early years, the 1839 appointment of the German theologian David Friedrich Strauss to its Chair of Theology caused a major controversy, since Strauss argued that the miracles in the Christian New Testament were mythical retellings of normal events as supernatural happenings. Eventually, the authorities offered Strauss a pension before he had a chance to start his duties.

The university allowed women to attend philosophy lectures from 1847, and admitted the first female doctoral student in 1866. The Faculty of Veterinary Medicine was added in 1901, the second-oldest such faculty in the world. In 1914, the university moved to new premises designed by the architect Karl Moser on Rämistrasse 71.

Campus
The university is scattered all over the city of Zürich. The main campuses are located in the city centre, Irchelpark and Oerlikon.  Members of the university can use several libraries, including the ETH-library, and the Zurich Central Library, with over 5 million volumes.
In 1962, the faculty of science proposed to establish the Irchelpark campus on the Strickhofareal. The first stage the construction of the university buildings was begun in 1973, and the campus was inaugurated in 1979. The construction of the second stage lasted from 1978 to 1983. The campus also houses the anthropological museum Anthropologisches Museum, and the cantonal Staatsarchiv Zürich.

Museums
The Institute and Museum for the History of Medicine is part of the university. The university includes 13 museums: the Anatomical Collection, the Archaeological Collection, the Botanical Museum, the Museum of Wax Moulages, the Science Exploratorium, the Museum of Veterinary History, the Zürich Herbaria, the Museum of Anthropology, the Botanical Garden, the Ethnographic Museum, the Paleontological Museum, the Veterinary Anatomy Collection and the Zoological Museum.

Academics

In the fields of bioscience and finance, there is a close-knit collaboration between the University of Zurich and the ETH (Federal Institute for Technology, just across the road).

Rankings

 Shanghai Jiao Tong University Ranking (heavy emphasis on research output – citations, Nobel prizes etc.)
54th globally and 15th in Europe.
 THES – QS World University Rankings (heavy emphasis on peer review)
61st globally and 14th in Europe.
 QS World University Rankings 2020 
76th globally.
 Professional Ranking of World Universities (Based on the number of alumni listed among CEOs in the 500 largest worldwide companies.)
32nd globally and 10th in Europe.
 University Ranking by Academic Performance (URAP) 2010
52nd globally and 1st in Switzerland.

 Round University Ranking:

36th globally in 2020

33rd globally in 2017

29th globally in 2013

14th globally in 2011

 USNWR Global:
 
58th globally in 2018

 According to GWTS Leiden Ranking, University of Zurich ranked 37th in the world in social sciences and humanities. According to URAP Center Ranking, which has been publishing rankings since 2010 for each subject, political science at the University of Zurich was placed 16th best in the world. According to ARWU, the University of Zurich was placed 31st globally in political sciences in 2019 and 27th globally in political sciences in 2020.

The university's  Department of Economics is especially strong and was ranked first in the German-speaking area by the Handelsblatt in 2017. In 2009, the faculty of Business Administration was ranked third in the German-speaking area.

Language policy

Bachelor courses are taught in Swiss Standard German ("Hochdeutsch"), but use of English is increasing in many faculties. The only bachelors program taught entirely in English is the "English Language and Literature" program. All Master courses at the Faculty of Science are held in English. Master courses in Economics and Finance are mainly held in English, while the Master of Science in Quantitative Finance is held completely in English.

Student life
The university's Academic Sports Association (ASVZ) offers a wide range of sports facilities to students of the university. The student body is represented through the Verband der Studierenden der Universität Zürich VSUZH which organizes events and is involved in the university administration.

Notable alumni and faculty

Politics, law and society

Economics, business and management

Science

Philosophy and theology 
Eberhard Jüngel (1934–2021), German Lutheran theologian

Arts and music 
 Luzia von Wyl (born 1985), Swiss composer and pianist

Nobel Prize laureates
Associated with the university are 12 Nobel Prize recipients, primarily in Physics and Chemistry.

Associated institutions 

 Corpus Córporum, digital library created and maintained by the university's Institute for Greek and Latin Philology.
 Swiss National Supercomputing Centre

See also

 List of largest universities by enrollment in Switzerland
 List of modern universities in Europe (1801–1945)

Notes and references

External links

 Union of students' associations of the University of Zurich
 The Ranking Forum of Swiss Universities

 
1833 establishments in Switzerland
Chiropractic schools
Cultural property of national significance in the canton of Zürich
Culture of Zürich
Educational institutions established in 1833
Hochschulen
Zurich
Schools in Zürich
Zurich